Eduardo Nicol (Barcelona, Catalonia 13 December 1907 - México 6 May 1990) was a Mexican-Catalan philosopher. He arrived in Mexico in 1939, obtained his major in philosophy from National Autonomous University of Mexico (UNAM), the biggest university in Mexico, where he taught from 1940. While at UNAM, he became the chairs of adolescent psychology and the history of psychology following .

Bibliography
He is author of many books, collected by the press house FCE (Fondo de Cultura Económica) his most notable ones are:
Psicología de las situaciones vitales
La idea del hombre
Historicismo y existencialismo
La vocación humana
Metafísica de la expresión
El problema de la filosofía hispánica
Los principios de la ciencia
El porvenir de la filosofía
Metafísica de la expresión (nueva versión)
La idea del hombre (nueva versión)
La primera teoría de la praxis
La reforma de la filosofía
La agonía de Proteo
Crítica de la razón simbólica
Ideas de vario linaje
Formas de hablar sublime. Poesía y filosofía

References 

1907 births
1990 deaths
People from Barcelona
Mexican people of Catalan descent
National Autonomous University of Mexico alumni
Spanish emigrants to Mexico
20th-century Mexican philosophers
20th-century Spanish philosophers